Akbar Ali (born 20 March 1973) is an Indian-born international cricket umpire based in the United Arab Emirates. He stood in his first Twenty20 International (T20I) match between Ireland and the United Arab Emirates on 16 February 2016. In October 2016 he was selected as one of the eight umpires to stand in matches in the 2016 ICC World Cricket League Division Four tournament. He stood in his first One Day International (ODI) match between Scotland and Hong Kong on 22 January 2017.

See also
 List of One Day International cricket umpires
 List of Twenty20 International cricket umpires

References

External links
 

1973 births
Living people
Emirati One Day International cricket umpires
Emirati Twenty20 International cricket umpires
Cricketers from Delhi
Indian emigrants to the United Arab Emirates
Indian expatriate sportspeople in the United Arab Emirates